Joyful is the debut studio album by German singer and songwriter Ayọ, released on 12 June 2006 by Polydor Records. The album was recorded over five days in New York City with producer Jay Newland.

Joyful was particularly successful in France, where it peaked at number six on the albums chart and was certified double platinum by the Syndicat National de l'Édition Phonographique (SNEP). The album also reached number one in Poland, number five in Italy and number eight in Finland.

Track listing

Personnel
Credits adapted from the liner notes of Joyful.

Musicians
 Ayọ – vocals, acoustic guitar, piano
 Larry Campbell – guitar, steel guitar, mandolin
 Brian Mitchell – Hammond B-3, accordion, harmonica, bass harmonica, piano
 Keith Christopher – bass great feel
 James Wormworth – drums
 Danny Sadownick – percussion
 Kyle Gordon – backing vocals

Technical
 Jay Newland – production, engineering
 Andy Manganello – engineering
 Geoff Rice – engineering assistance
 Mark Wilder – mastering

Artwork
 Aurélie Ullrich – art direction
 Jean-Marc Lubrano – photography
 Rapho – photography

Charts

Weekly charts

Year-end charts

Certifications

Release history

References

2006 debut albums
Ayọ albums
Interscope Records albums
Polydor Records albums
European Border Breakers Award-winning albums